Prime Cuts is a compilation album by progressive metal band Shadow Gallery. This was the final release from the band on Magna Carta Records. The band compiled the track listing which consisted of 9 original studio cuts, 2 edits and an original unreleased demo from the Carved In Stone sessions. This album contains no songs from the Room V album as that was released on Inside Out Records. The album was pressed with an error, the track listing says track 1 is "Mystery" from the Tyranny album. But in fact, it is "Out Of Nowhere" also from the Tyranny album, which is heard.

Track listing

Personnel
 Kevin Soffera - Drums and Percussions
 Joe Nevolo - Drums and Percussions
 Ben Timely - Drums and Percussions (Ben Timely is a name that the band gave to the Alesis HR-16 drum machine)
 Carl Cadden-James - Bass guitar, Vocals, Flute
 Brendt Allman - Acoustic, Electric guitars, Vocals
 Chris Ingles - Keyboards and Synthesizer
 Gary Wehrkamp - Guitars, Keyboards, Vocals
 Mike Baker - Lead Vocals

Shadow Gallery albums
2007 compilation albums